The April Lyrids are a meteor shower lasting from April 16 to April 25 each year. The radiant of the meteor shower is located in the constellation Lyra, near its brightest star, Vega. The peak of the shower is typically around April 22 each year.

The source of the meteor shower are particles of dust shed by the long-period Comet C/1861 G1 Thatcher. The April Lyrids are the strongest annual shower of meteors from debris of a long-period comet, mainly because as far as other intermediate long-period comets go (200–10,000 years), this one has a relatively short orbital period of about 415 years. The Lyrids have been observed and reported since 687 BC; no other modern shower has been recorded as far back in time.

The shower usually peaks around April 22 and the morning of April 23. Counts typically range from 5 to 20 meteors per hour, averaging around 10. As a result of light pollution, observers in rural areas will see more than observers in a city. Nights without the Moon in the sky will reveal the most meteors. April Lyrid meteors are usually around magnitude +2. However, some meteors can be brighter, known as "Lyrid fireballs", cast shadows for a split second and leave behind smokey debris trails that last minutes.

Occasionally, the shower intensifies when the planets steer the one-revolution dust trail of the comet into Earth's path, an event that happens about once every 60 years.  This results in an April Lyrid meteor outburst. The one-revolution dust trail is dust that has completed one orbit: the stream of dust released in the return of the comet prior to the current 1862 return. This mechanism replaces earlier ideas that the outbursts were due to a cloud of dust moving in a 60-year orbit. In 1982, amateur astronomers counted 90 April Lyrids per hour at the peak and similar rates were seen in 1922. A stronger storm of up to 700 per hour occurred in 1803, and was observed by a journalist in Richmond, Virginia:

Shooting stars. This electrical phenomenon was observed on Wednesday morning last at Richmond and its vicinity, in a manner that alarmed many, and astonished every person that beheld it. From one until three in the morning, those starry meteors seemed to fall from every point in the heavens, in such numbers as to resemble a shower of sky rockets ...

Another such outburst, and the oldest known, the shower on March 23.7, 687 BC (proleptic Julian calendar) was recorded in Zuo Zhuan, which describes the shower as "On the 4th month in the summer in the year of xīn-mǎo (of year 7 of King Zhuang of Lu), at night, (the sky is so bright that some) fixed stars become invisible (because of the meteor shower); at midnight, stars fell like rain." (夏四月辛卯 夜 恆星不見 夜中 星隕如雨) In the Australian Aboriginal astronomy of the Boorong tribe, the Lyrids represent the scratchings of the Mallee fowl (represented by Vega), coinciding with its nest-building season.

Notes and references

External links 
 Worldwide viewing times for the 2016 Lyrids meteor shower (Spacedex Apr 15, 2016)
 Lyrids results for 2012 / Lyrids in 2012 (International Meteor Organization)
 Everything you need to know: Lyrid meteor shower (Earthsky Apr 04, 2013)
 Catch a Glimpse of the 2013 Lyrids (NASA Marshall Space Flight Center)
 April's Lyrid Meteor Shower
 2009 Meteor Calendar (Gary Kronk)
 NASA Orbital diagram for comet C/1861 G1 (Thatcher) (source of the Lyrids)
 Lyrid Meteor Shower at Constellation Guide

Meteor showers
April events